An incomplete list of events in Italy in 1248:

Events
 Battle of Parma
 University of Piacenza recognized as a university 
 Viam agnoscere veritatis (1248)

Deaths
 Taddeo da Suessa, jurist

Births
 Angela of Foligno

Italy
Italy
Years of the 13th century in Italy